Ramin Toloui  is an American academic, civil servant, and financial advisor who serves as Assistant Secretary of State for Economic and Business Affairs in the Biden Administration.

Early life and education 
Toloui was born and raised in Iowa City, Iowa and attended Iowa City High School. He earned a Bachelor of Arts degree from Harvard University and an MPhil from Balliol College at Oxford University.

Career 
Toloui served as the global co-head of Emerging Markets Portfolio Management at PIMCO, a position he held since 2011, and chaired the firm’s Asia-Pacific Portfolio Committee since 2012. Toloui joined PIMCO in 2006 as a Portfolio Manager for emerging markets, adding responsibilities for global bond portfolios in 2009. Previously, Toloui held a variety of jobs at the Department of the Treasury, including Director of the Office of the Western Hemisphere from 2003 to 2006, Senior Adviser to the Under Secretary for International Affairs from 2001 to 2003, and Deputy Director and International Economist in the Office of Central and Southeastern Europe from 1999 to 2001.

Toloui was confirmed by the United States Senate on November 20, 2014, to serve as Assistant Secretary of the Treasury for International Finance and Development. In this position, Toloui was responsible for leading Department’s work on international monetary affairs, coordination with the G-20, and regional and bilateral economic issues.

Since leaving the Treasury Department, Toloui has worked as a professor of international finance and fellow at the Stanford Institute for Economic Policy Research.

In November 2020, Toloui was named a volunteer member of the Joe Biden presidential transition Agency Review Team to support transition efforts related to the United States Department of State.

On July 30, 2021, Toloui was announced to be the nominee for Assistant Secretary of State for Economic and Business Affairs at United States Department of State. He was confirmed by the Senate on December 16, 2021, by a vote of 76-13.

Resources 

Harvard University alumni
Living people
Alumni of Balliol College, Oxford
American people of Iranian descent
United States Assistant Secretaries of the Treasury
United States Assistant Secretaries of State
Year of birth missing (living people)
People from Iowa City, Iowa
Iowa City High School alumni
Obama administration personnel
Biden administration personnel